The Illusions Gaming Company was a video game developer in the mid-1990s, best known for producing point-and-click adventure games based on several licensed properties.

The company was founded in 1993 by two former Virgin Interactive employees, Darren Bartlett and James Coliz.

Games

Super Caesars Palace – Super NES, Sega Genesis, Game Gear (1993)
Scooby-Doo Mystery – Sega Genesis (1995)
Blazing Dragons – PlayStation, Sega Saturn (1996)
Duckman: The Graphic Adventures of a Private Dick – Microsoft Windows, Mac OS, PlayStation (1997)
Beavis and Butt-Head: Bunghole in One – Microsoft Windows (1998)
Beavis and Butt-Head Do U. – Microsoft Windows (1999)

References

Defunct video game companies of the United States